The Road Hammers are a Canadian country rock group composed of Jason McCoy, Clayton Bellamy and Chris Byrne. Formed by McCoy as a side project, the trio's music is influenced by 1960s and 1970s trucker music and Southern rock. Their first self-titled album included remakes of several classic truck-driving songs. It was recognized with a Juno Award in 2006, along with numerous Canadian Country Music Association awards. After five years together, the group went on hiatus after one last show on December 31, 2010, in Langley, British Columbia.The group reformed in 2013 and released Wheels in 2014. In May 2017, The Road Hammers released their latest album, The Squeeze.

History 

The Road Hammers was founded in 2004 as a project by lead singer and guitarist Jason McCoy, a multiple-time winner of Canadian Country Music Association male vocalist of the year. He stated the idea was to play trucker music, and came together with two other musicians with similar views on music - country-rocker Clayton Bellamy, whose father is a truck driver, and bassist Chris Byrne, a Newfoundlander.  In addition to recording their self-titled album, the Road Hammers was also the subject of a reality show of the same name on Country Music Television in Canada.

The album The Road Hammers was released in 2005, and received strong reviews for its Southern rock sound and covers of classic songs. It debuted at No. 1 on the Canadian country albums chart. Covers on the album included "Girl on the Billboard," the 1965 number-one hit for Del Reeves, "East Bound and Down" by Jerry Reed, and Little Feat's "Willin'." In the wake of the album release, The Road Hammers swept to the upper end of the Canadian country charts; four songs reached the top 10 through 2005 and 2006, and the band was nominated for six CCMA Awards winning Group or Duo of the Year. It was also recognized at the Juno Awards for Country Recording of the Year. The album's success continued into 2006, with the Road Hammers receiving two CCMA awards, Group or Duo of the Year and Best Video.

In July 2007, McCoy stated that the band will be part of a second season of its reality show, following its attempts to secure a recording deal with an American label. In late 2007, The Road Hammers signed to an American record label, Montage Music Group and the group's debut American single, "I Don't Know When to Quit" was released on December 10. Their second album, entitled Blood, Sweat, and Steel, was released on June 24, 2008.

The Road Hammers released their second Canadian album, The Road Hammers II, on February 24, 2009. The album's first single, "Homegrown," has reached the Top 20 of the Canadian country singles chart.

Bellamy and McCoy were contestants on the reality show Mantracker on September 6, 2010, where they both beat the hunters to the finish line.

On October 8, 2013, The Road Hammers released a single titled "Get On Down the Road" on iTunes in Canada and the United States.

Discography

Studio albums

Singles

2000s

2010s and 2020s

Guest singles

Music videos

Awards and nominations

References

External links
Official Homepage
Clayton Bellamy's Solo Project

Canadian country music groups
Canadian country rock groups
Juno Award for Country Album of the Year winners
Open Road Recordings artists
Montage Music Group artists
Canadian Country Music Association Group or Duo of the Year winners